The 1867 Open Championship was the eighth Open Championship and was held on 26 September at Prestwick Golf Club. Tom Morris, Sr. won the championship for the fourth time, by two shots from Willie Park, Sr. Tom Morris, Sr. was 46 years old and remains the oldest Open Championship winner.

For the first time, an amateur, William Doleman, led after a first round of 55, a stroke ahead of Robert Andrew. Doleman had a second round 66 and dropped out of contention. Tom Morris, after a round of 54, went into the lead with Willie Park and Robert Andrew two shots behind. Andrew had a final round of 65 to drop him out of the prize money. Andrew Strath had the best final round of 56 to finish third, while young Tom Morris finished with prize money for the first time.

Final leaderboard
Source:

Thursday, 26 September 1867

References

External links
Prestwick 1867 (Official site)

The Open Championship
Golf tournaments in Scotland
Open Championship
Open Championship
Open Championship